Banganga  is a municipality in Kapilvastu District in the Lumbini Zone of southern Nepal. Banganga Municipality has total of 233.6 km2. According to the 2011 census, total population of the municipality is 75, 242 with population density of 322 person per km2 and density without forest is 804 persons per km2.

Headquarter 
Banganga  recently transformed from Village Development Committee to Municipality in 2015. Hence, the headquarter is in jitpur. However, various municipality works are being done in Gajehada and Jitpur. Jitpur has the main entry gate for the highway running towards south, mainly Taulihawa which is the headquarter of Kapilvastu district. Jitpur is one of the rapidly growing hub in the municipality where many banks and other important businesses are located.

Municipality government  
The local level election of Nepal 2017 AD was held peacefully in Banganga Municipality. Mangal Prasad Tharu  is the current mayor of Banganga municipality. Chakrapani Aryal holds the post of Deputy Mayor of the municipality.

Main cities/villages 
Jeetpur is the main city in the municipality, which is rapidly developing in various sectors like banking, education, and health. The largest community hospital of Banganga is located in Jeetpur. There are various things to do in and around Jeetpur. Visiting the main gate, visiting the exhibition during winter, shopping in some beautiful stores, eating in good restaurants and playing sports in open fields are some of the main things to do in Jitpur for visitors.

Bangai is also one of the rapidly growing town in the municipality. It is rapidly growing in various sectors like education, banking, market, buildings etc. It is one of the most crowded area over here.

Bunchi is one of the peace village in Banganga municipality of Kapilvastu district. Here mainly people are educated. Some of the people are doctor, policeman, engineer, teacher but most of the people are agricultural work. Siddhartha Secondary School is one of the school which is situated in Bunchi.

Banganga river area also called Banganga village is another good place in Banganga municipality. The long bridge in Banganga village is one of the points of attraction. People of Banganga village are involved in crusher industries as it is near to the river.

Bodgaun also called Boardgauu is another nice village in Banganga municipality. It has the municipality's largest educational institute in its suburb (Laugain), named Banganga Uchha Maabi where a student can start his education and go all the way through master's degree. The main points of attraction in Bodgaun are Jaleshwor temple (which also provides ayurvedic medications), the largest school itself, Laugain pond, and some nice buildings in the village. With the villager's co operation and the municipality, the roads are pitched and the village is pollution free.

Media 
To promote local culture Banganga has many FM radio station, Heart beat F.M.-91.6 Radio Buddha Awaj - 89.6 MHz, which is a community radio station,  Radio Mayadevi 106.1 MHz, Radio  Banganga 90.6 MHz are other local FM radio station in Banganga Municipality. The people of Banganga municipality look active in various activities and sports like Karate, speech, debate and cultural performances. They have local exhibition every year.

Education 
There are various schools and colleges in Banganga municipality. Siddharth Campus is the first campus in this municipality, started with certificate (+2 level), is now developed and provide masters level degree in education and management stream.  Janta Higher Secondary school in Banganga Municipality, is the first and only available school within Kapilvastu district, providing higher education (10+2 Level) in Science Faculty. Banganga Uchha Maabi is one of the most famous educational institute in the municipality. Besides that, there are various educational institutes out of which some are listed below:
1.Siddhartha Secondary School-01 Bunchi
1. Golden Horizon English Boarding School
2. Children's Paradise English Boarding School  
3. Ex Army English Boarding School
4. Parijat English Boarding School
5. Kapilvastu Vidhya Mandir 
6. Our Wisdom English Boarding School
7. Gyanpunja English Boarding School
8. Horizon English Boarding School
9. Hillbert English Boarding Schoo
10. Shree Annapurna Vidhya Mandir 
11. Laxmanghaat Mavi Banganga-06,Kapilvastu
The education of this municipality is being developed day by day as various infrastructures are being added. Students now have access to internet in some schools via various local WIFI broadcasting services.

Landscape 
The Siwalik Hills are particularly prone to landslides due to specific geological factors.

Border 
The border of banganga, nepal has been changed due to a dam constructed on the indian side. indian paramilitaries have overseen construction which will lead to an artificial lake in Banganga.

References

Populated places in Kapilvastu District